Martha Joy (Born Martha Joy Lim-Fiuza), born December 8 1990, is a Filipino-Canadian singer.

Early years
Joy was born in 1990 in Toronto, Ontario of mixed Filipino and Portuguese parentage. She began singing at a young age with the help of vocal coaches. At her first solo concert in November 2007, Joy sang 22 songs at the Toronto Centre for the Arts. She currently specializes in classical crossover, R&B, and pop music.

Career 
Joy has had solo performances before the United nations Global Peace Initiative in Geneva, Switzerland; The Mike Bullard Show on CTV; and of the singing of the Canadian national anthem for the Toronto Raptors game at the Air Canada Centre. She sings in English, French, Italian, Spanish, Portuguese and Tagalog.

In 2007, Joy auditioned for Canadian Idol, and was at the time the youngest contestant to make it to the Top Ten Finals at the age of 16. Her appearance on the show's fifth season allowed her to seriously pursue a career in the music industry. In February 2008 she signed an exclusive recording contract with Viva Records. In February 2009, her debut album, titled Martha Joy was released. Her first single release was 'Dumating ka', which was composed by Jimmy Borja. 

In 2009 she also performed at the World Championships of the Performing Arts, where she won several categories.

She has also appeared on SOP Rules and Walang Tulugan with the Master Showman.

Awards 
In 2001 Joy won six first-place awards in the Kiwanis Music Festival.

Joy won Best Contemporary Pop singer and Best Child Broadway performer at the September 2003 Best New Talent Awards in Los Angeles.

Discography

Albums 
 Martha Joy (2009)

Singles 

 Here I Am (2002); produced by Christian de Walden
 Songs from the Heart (2007); produced by Jack Lenz
 Dumating Ka (2009); produced by Orin Isaacs

References

External links
Canadian Idol page

1990 births
Living people
Canadian musicians of Filipino descent
Canadian musicians of Chinese descent
Canadian people of Portuguese descent
Musicians from Toronto
Viva Artists Agency
Viva Records (Philippines) artists
21st-century Canadian women singers
Canadian emigrants to the Philippines
Canadian Idol participants